Rhyncolus ater, is a species of weevil found in Europe and Asia.

Description
The average length of the species is about 3.0 to 4.5 mm.

Larval development occur in rotten wood. It is also known to attack industrial wood.

References 

Curculionidae
Insects of Sri Lanka
Beetles described in 1758